Vacuum cementing or vacuum welding is the natural process of solidifying small objects in a hard vacuum.  The most notable example is dust on the surface of the Moon.

This effect was reported to be a problem with the first American and Soviet satellites, as small moving parts would seize together.

In 2009 the European Space Agency published a peer-reviewed paper detailing why cold welding is a significant issue that spacecraft designers need to carefully consider. The conclusions of this appropriately titled study can be found on page 25 of "Assessment of Cold Welding Between Separable Contact Surfaces due to Impact and Fretting Under Vacuum". The paper also cites a documented example from 1991 with the Galileo spacecraft high-gain antenna (see page 2; the technical source document from NASA regarding the Galileo spacecraft is also provided in a link here).

One source of difficulty is that vacuum (AKA cold) welding does not exclude relative motion between the surfaces that are to be joined. This allows the broadly defined notions of galling, fretting, sticking, stiction and adhesion to overlap in some instances. For example, it is possible for a joint to be the result of both vacuum welding and galling (and/or fretting and/or impact). Galling and vacuum welding, therefore, are not mutually exclusive.

See also

References 
 The Implications of the Ranger Moon Pictures (Page 4 references lunar dust vacuum welding)
 Lunar Rated Fasteners (Page 3 specifies how to build components resistant to vacuum welding)

Spaceflight technology
Vacuum